Laura Tomlinson MBE (née Bechtolsheimer; born 31 January 1985, in Mainz, Germany) is a German-British dressage rider competing at Olympic level.
As of 30 June 2012 the Fédération Équestre Internationale (FEI) ranked her 3rd in the world riding Mistral Højris and 36th on Andretti H. In that year, Tomlinson, riding Mistral Højris under her maiden name of Laura Bechtolsheimer, won two medals in the 2012 Summer Olympics in London; gold for Great Britain in the team dressage with Carl Hester and Charlotte Dujardin, the first ever Olympic team gold in the discipline for her country, and bronze in the individual dressage behind gold medalist and compatriot Dujardin.

Early life

A granddaughter of the German billionaire property magnate Karl-Heinz Kipp who founded the Massa chain of department stores, Bechtolsheimer was born in Mainz, West Germany in 1985 to German parents Wilfried, an entrepreneur and horse trainer, and Ursula Bechtolsheimer-Kipp. She has three brothers, Felix, a singer formerly with rock group Hey Negrita and now with Curse of Lono, Goetz, and Till, a businessman and amateur racing driver who competes in the 2021 IMSA SportsCar Championship.  The family moved to Ampney St Peter in Gloucestershire when she was one.

Career

Bechtolsheimer started riding aged three having been given a pony called Peacock for her birthday.  She went on to compete in Pony Club eventing and won the National Championships of Independent Schools at Stonar School aged 12. Bechtolsheimer attended St Marys Calne school in Wiltshire, and started to concentrate on dressage aged 13.  She was selected to ride at the Pony European Championship the following season, winning a team silver medal at her first major competition.

In 2005, Bechtolsheimer became the youngest British dressage champion at age 20, riding Douglas Dorsey. She graduated from Bristol University in 2007 with a BSc in Philosophy and Politics. She competed in the 2008 Olympic Games on Mistral Højris, gaining 18th place in the Individual Grand Prix Special and 6th place in the team event and was named as British Dressage's Rider of the Year.

At the 2010 FEI World Equestrian Games held in Kentucky, United States, Bechtolsheimer surpassed her personal best scores and gained three British International Grand Prix records with Mistral Højris getting 82.511% in the Grand Prix, 81.708% in the Grand Prix Special and 85.350% in the Grand Prix Freestyle, gaining her three silver medals, being beaten only by the celebrated Edward Gal and Totilas.

In 2012 Bechtolsheimer, who scored 80.550%, Carl Hester and Charlotte Dujardin won the gold medal in the Olympic team dressage event. She went on to win bronze in the individual event with her freestyle routine, set to music from The Lion King.

In 2016, she rode Rosalie B at the Olympia London International Horse Show. It was the first outing for the mare on British soil and followed a strong performance at the German CDI Oldenburg, where they won the grand prix special with 75.88%.

She was appointed Member of the Order of the British Empire (MBE) in the 2013 New Year Honours for services to equestrianism.

Outside of her dressage activities, Bechtolsheimer is a presenter for equine video website HorseHero.com and is considering a career in public relations and marketing.

Notable Horses 

 Douglas Dorsey - 1991 Chestnut Hanoverian Gelding (Donnerhall x Salem)
 2004 European Young Riders Championships - Team Bronze Medal, Individual Fifth Place, Individual Fourth Place Freestyle
 2006 FEI World Cup Final - 14th Place
 2006 World Equestrian Games - Team Sixth Place, Individual 21st Place
 Mistral Højris - 1995 Chestnut Danish Warmblood Gelding (Michellino x Ibsen)
 2007 European Championships - Team Fifth Place, Individual 20th Place
 2008 Beijing Olympics - Team Fifth Place, Individual 17th Place
 2009 European Championships - Team Silver Medal, Individual Bronze Medal, Individual Fourth Place Freestyle
 2010 World Equestrian Games - Team Silver Medal, Individual Silver Medal, Individual Silver Medal Freestyle
 2011 European Championships - Team Gold Medal, Individual Silver Medal, Individual Fourth Place Freestyle
 2012 London Olympics - Team Gold Medal, Individual Bronze Medal

Personal life

Bechtolsheimer married professional polo player Mark Tomlinson. The couple have three children (Annalisa, Wilfred and Hanni) and was expecting a fourth child in 2021.

See also

 2012 Summer Olympics and Paralympics gold post boxes

References

External links

 Fédération Équestre Internationale – Biographies – Bechtolsheimer, Laura
 British Dressage – Official Rider Biography – Laura Bechtolsheimer
 HorseHero – Laura Bechtolsheimer
 Laura Tomlinson's web site

Living people
1985 births
British dressage riders
Sportspeople from Mainz
German emigrants to England
Equestrians at the 2008 Summer Olympics
Olympic equestrians of Great Britain
English female equestrians
Equestrians at the 2012 Summer Olympics
Olympic bronze medallists for Great Britain
Olympic gold medallists for Great Britain
Olympic medalists in equestrian
Alumni of the University of Bristol
Members of the Order of the British Empire
People educated at St Mary's School, Calne
Medalists at the 2012 Summer Olympics
German female equestrians
People from Cotswold District
Naturalised citizens of the United Kingdom